Black Mountain is a District Electoral Area used to elect 7 councillors to Belfast City Council.

It is named after the Black Mountain.

The district was created for the 2014 election. It combined 4 of the 6 wards from the abolished Upper Falls Electoral Area with 3 of the 5 wards from the abolished Lower Falls Electoral Area

At the election in May 2014 it elected 5 Sinn Féin councillors, 1 Social Democratic and Labour Party councillor, and Gerry Carroll of the People Before Profit Alliance. At the election in May 2019 it elected 6 Sinn Féin councillors and 1 People Before Profit Alliance councillor.

Councillors

2019 results
2014: 5 x Sinn Féin, 1 x People Before Profit, 1 x SDLP

2019: 6 x Sinn Féin, 1 x People Before Profit

2014-2019 Change: Sinn Féin gain from SDLP

2014 results
2014: 5 x Sinn Féin, 1 x People Before Profit, 1 x SDLP

References

External links 
results

Electoral wards of Belfast
2014 establishments in Northern Ireland